Álex Escrig Reche (born 21 February 2004) is a Spanish Grand Prix motorcycle racer competing in the 2023 Moto2 World Championship for MV Agusta Forward Team. He previously competed in the FIM CEV Moto2 European Championship, finishing third overall in 2022. Escrig also won the FIM CEV Superstock 600 European Championship in 2021.

Career statistics

Red Bull MotoGP Rookies Cup

Races by year
(key) (Races in bold indicate pole position, races in italics indicate fastest lap)

FIM CEV Superstock 600 European Championship

Races by year
(key) (Races in bold indicate pole position, races in italics indicate fastest lap)

FIM Moto2 European Championship

Races by year
(key) (Races in bold indicate pole position, races in italics indicate fastest lap)

FIM CEV Moto2

By season

Grand Prix motorcycle racing

By season

By class

Races by year
(key) (Races in bold indicate pole position; races in italics indicate fastest lap)

References

External links

 

2004 births
Living people
Sportspeople from Valencia
Spanish motorcycle racers
MotoE World Cup riders
Moto2 World Championship riders